Săulești is a commune in Gorj County, Oltenia, Romania. It is composed of four villages: Bibești, Dolcești, Purcaru and Săulești.

References

Communes in Gorj County
Localities in Oltenia